Bell Buttress is a forked flat-topped ridge,  long, which extends north from The Fortress in the Cruzen Range of Victoria Land, into the southwest part of Victoria Upper Névé. Named by the Advisory Committee on Antarctic Names in 2005 after Robin E. Bell, Lamont–Doherty Earth Observatory, Columbia University, Palisades, NY; aerogeophysical research of the lithosphere of the West Antarctic Rift System (CASERTZ), five field seasons 1991–99.

Bell Buttress is named after Robin Bell.

References

Mountains of Victoria Land